Muntinlupa's at-large congressional district is the sole congressional district of the Philippines in the city of Muntinlupa. It has been represented in the House of Representatives of the Philippines since 1998. Muntinlupa first elected a single representative city-wide at-large for the 11th Congress following its conversion into a highly-urbanized city through Republic Act No. 7926 on March 1, 1995. Before 1998, its territory was represented as part of Las Piñas–Muntinlupa, Taguig–Pateros–Muntinlupa, Rizal's 1st and at-large district, and Manila's at-large district. It is currently represented in the 19th Congress by Jaime Fresnedi of Liberal Party (LP).

Representation history

Election results

2022

2019

2016

2013

2010

See also
Legislative district of Muntinlupa

References

Congressional districts of the Philippines
Politics of Muntinlupa
1995 establishments in the Philippines
At-large congressional districts of the Philippines
Congressional districts of Metro Manila
Constituencies established in 1995